Ralph Donald Turlington Sr. (October 5, 1920 – May 12, 2021) was an American politician from the state of Florida.

Early life
Turlington was born in Gainesville, Florida in 1920. Turlington was in the inaugural class of the P. K. Yonge Developmental Research School, where he was a distinguished alumni, graduating in 1938. He attended the University of Florida, where he was also a distinguished alumni, to obtain a Bachelor of Science degree in business and Harvard University for his master's degree in the same field.

After completing his education, Turlington served in the United States Army during World War II and the Korean War. After the war, he worked at the University of Florida. In 1947, he became a faculty member of Alpha Kappa Psi Professional Business Fraternity. He received a Distinguished Alumni Award from the University of Florida in 1968.

Florida House of Representatives
He was elected to the Florida House of Representatives in 1950 for Alachua County. He would serve until 1974, eventually also serving as speaker from 1967 to 1969. He was the Florida Commissioner of Education from 1974 to 1987. He was elected to Constitutional office in Florida more times than any other person in the history of Florida. Following his service as Commissioner of Education, Turlington joined the American College Testing Program (ACT) and served full-time as a consultant to longtime friend Dr. James W. Carr.

Personal life
Turlington was married to Ann Gellerstedt (until her death in 2003) and had two children, Donald and Katherine. Turlington died on May 12, 2021, at the age of 100, in Durham, North Carolina.

Legacy
A large building at the University of Florida, Ralph D. Turlington Hall, is named after him. It is located in the center of campus, houses multiple departments in the College_of_Liberal_Arts_and_Sciences, and over a hundred classrooms. The Florida Department of Education headquarters in Tallahassee, the Turlington Building, is also named in his honor.

References

1920 births
2021 deaths
Florida Commissioners of Education
Harvard Business School alumni
People from Gainesville, Florida
Military personnel from Florida
Warrington College of Business alumni
Speakers of the Florida House of Representatives
Democratic Party members of the Florida House of Representatives
American centenarians
Men centenarians
United States Army personnel of World War II
United States Army personnel of the Korean War